Song of the Swallows is a children's book written and illustrated by Leo Politi. Published by Scribner, it was the recipient of the Caldecott Medal for illustration in 1950.

Plot
The book tells the story of Juan who lives in an adobe house which is located near Mission San Juan Capistrano. It isn't too far from the school. In fact, Juan is good friends with Julian who's an old bell ringer and a gardener that isn't sure about the swallows' migration to a peaceful island in the summer. Julian explains to Juan how this beautiful mission was founded by Saint Francis and his brothers, especially Father Junipero Serra. He also explains to the Spanish lad how unsure he is about the swallow family's migration. Juan and Julian really love the swallows (las golondrinas) very much and doesn't want them to leave Mission San Juan Capistrano. He and his friend feed tiny pieces of bread that Julian saves in his pockets. Plenty of birds appear in the garden including hummingbirds, sparrows, white doves and especially swallows. In the spring, he plants a garden on his vacation time. There's nothing more exciting to see the family of swallows nesting in the protagonist's very own garden.  One of the children tells the other the amazing journey the swallows make all the way from South America to spend the summer in California during St. Joseph's Day to watch a family of swallows migrate far away from San Juan Capistrano to a peaceful island. On Saint Joseph's Day, Juan's dream comes true which gets to the point where Juan and Julian alert everyone in the village by ringing the bells of Mission San Juan Capistrano together. The swallow family gets to nest in the arches of the mission after all before summer begins. One day, a baby swallow falls out of the nest and Juan witnesses the shock of the situation with his feathered friends. His/her parents don't reject the chick at all after Juan saved him/her. Everyone gets ready for Saint Joseph's Day by dressing up and celebrating before summer arrives in the village. Juan sings "Las Golondrinas" before he plants his own garden for the swallows to nest at during his vacation time. On Saint Joseph's Day, the children sing "The Swallow Song" together while they join Juan in the garden. Juan returns to his adobe house and observes the migration of the swallows who nested in his garden on a rose bush that appears near Mission San Juan Capistrano. They'll always come back to Mission San Juan Capistrano in the spring even though he gets to hear Julian sing the swallow song that the children also sang on Saint Joseph's Day.

References

American picture books
Caldecott Medal–winning works
1949 children's books